Ashton Dewayne Hagans (born July 8, 1999) is an American professional basketball player for the Greensboro Swarm of the NBA G League. He played college basketball for the Kentucky Wildcats.

High school career
Hagans attended Newton High School in Covington, Georgia where he averaged 20.2 points, 10.7 assists, 7.6 rebounds and 3.6 steals per game as a junior. He earned Mr. Basketball in Georgia as well as the Gatorade Georgia Player of the Year honors.

Recruiting
Hagans originally committed to Georgia on December 27, 2017. Hagans later decommitted from Georgia on February 26, 2018. On April 10, 2018, Hagans committed to play for Kentucky.

On June 15, 2018, Hagans reclassified to the 2018 class, allowing him to enroll at Kentucky.

College career
Hagans made his preseason debut for Kentucky on August 8, 2018, in an 85–61 win over the Bahamas National Team, scoring 6 points, collecting 5 rebounds, and 3 steals. On January 15, 2018, he scored 23 points in a 69–49 win over his former committed team, the Georgia Bulldogs. Hagans started the final 29 games of his freshman season and averaged 7.7 points, 4.3 assists, 2.6 rebounds and 1.6 steals per game. His 61 steals was the third highest by a freshman in program history behind John Wall (66) and Rajon Rondo (87). He was named SEC Co-Defensive Player of the Year.

Hagans suffered an ankle injury in a 71–59 win over Missouri on January 4, 2020. He missed a game against Florida on March 7 due to personal reasons. At the conclusion of the regular season, Hagans was named to the SEC All-Defensive Team. He averaged 11.5 points, 3.9 rebounds, 6.4 assists and 1.9 steals per game. Following the season, Hagans declared for the 2020 NBA draft.

Professional career
After going undrafted in the 2020 NBA draft, Hagans signed a two-way contract with the Minnesota Timberwolves.  Hagans played two minutes in two games without recording any statistics. On February 13, 2021, the Minnesota Timberwolves waived Hagans for violating NBA G League COVID protocols.

Hagans was expected to join the Toronto Raptors in 2021 NBA Summer League but was injured. He was signed by the Raptors on October 16, 2021, but was waived to join the Raptors 905.

On November 18, 2022, Hagans signed with the Fort Wayne Mad Ants after David Stockton entered health & safety protocols. He was waived 4 days later after appearing in 1 game. He then signed with the Greensboro Swarm, and in his first game with the team, posted a triple-double that included 22 assists, tied for the second-most in G League history.

Career statistics

NBA

Regular season

|-
| style="text-align:left;"|
| style="text-align:right;"| Minnesota
| 2 || 0 || 2.0 || .000 || .000 || .000 || 0.0 || 0.0 || 0.0 || 0.0 || 0.0 
|}

College 

|-
| style="text-align:left;"| 2018–19
| style="text-align:left;"| Kentucky
| 37 || 30 || 28.5 || .467 || .275 || .761 || 2.6 || 4.3 || 1.6 || .1 || 7.7
|-
| style="text-align:left;"| 2019–20
| style="text-align:left;"| Kentucky
| 30 || 29 || 33.1 || .404 || .258 || .810 || 3.9 || 6.4 || 1.9 || .2 || 11.5
|- class="top"
| style="text-align:center;" colspan="2"| Career
| 67 || 59 || 30.6 || .432 || .265 || .791 || 3.2 || 5.2 || 1.8 || .1 || 9.4
|}

Personal life
Hagans is the cousin of former NFL running back Ronnie Brown and former NBA player Trey Thompkins.

References

External links
Kentucky Wildcats bio

1999 births
Living people
American expatriate basketball people in Canada
American men's basketball players
Basketball players from Georgia (U.S. state)
Kentucky Wildcats men's basketball players
Minnesota Timberwolves players
People from Cartersville, Georgia
Point guards
Raptors 905 players
Sportspeople from the Atlanta metropolitan area
Undrafted National Basketball Association players